Meganephria is a genus of moths of the family Noctuidae.

Species
 Meganephria bimaculosa (Linnaeus, 1767)
 Meganephria cinerea (Butler, 1881)
 Meganephria crassa Kobayashi & Owada, 1996
 Meganephria extensa (Butler, 1879)
 Meganephria funesta (Leech, 1889)
 Meganephria kononenkoi Poole, 1989
 Meganephria laxa Kobayashi & Owada, 1996
 Meganephria parki Kononenko & Ronkay, 1998
 Meganephria retinea Gyulai & Ronkay, 1999
 Meganephria splendida Yoshimoto, 1993
 Meganephria tancrei (Graeser, 1888)
 Meganephria weixleri Hreblay & Ronkay, 1997

References
Natural History Museum Lepidoptera genus database
Meganephria at funet

Cuculliinae